2014 saw several notable wildfires igniting in California, especially during the month of May, when multiple fires were ablaze concurrently in Southern California, and during September, when several massive wildfires were burning in Northern California. In the context of the 2012–13 North American drought (especially the 2011–17 California drought), as well as powerful Santa Ana winds, weather conditions were ideal for wildfires. A total of 7,865 wildfires ignited throughout the year, which burned at least  of land. The wildfires caused a total of 146 injuries and 2 fatalities, in addition to causing at least $204.05 million (2014 USD) in damage.

The season began unusually early when a wildfire ignited on January 1, followed by 6 more fires igniting later within the same month. During a heat wave and dry Santa Ana conditions in May 2014, multiple wildfires broke out simultaneously in San Diego County, along with several other wildfires elsewhere in California. By mid-May, fire officials said they had already dealt with 1,400 wildfires in California in 2014 - twice the normal amount for that time of year - and a spokesman for CAL FIRE described the conditions as "unprecedented." The May 2014 San Diego County wildfires were estimated to have caused at least $60 million (2014 USD) in damage. In late June to early August, another group of wildfires ignited across the state, some of which reached over twenty thousand acres in size. In mid-September, the largest group of wildfires erupted, with some wildfires becoming larger than 50,000 acres in size. On October 8, an aerial tanker crashed during a firefighting effort at the Dog Rock Fire, which killed the pilot and sparked a small wildfire. From late September to late October, the latest flare-up of major wildfires were extinguished by cooler weather and precipitation.

From December 10–13, a powerful winter storm extinguished the remaining wildfires that were present. In mid-December through late December, several more small wildfires sparked, but they were all extinguished by December 31.

In 2014, a study examined the human role in growing California wildfire risks. The paper is titled "Extreme fire season in California: A glimpse into the future?" It was published as the second chapter of "Explaining Extreme Events of 2014", by the American Meteorological Society. The authors also projected into the future, and the predicted results showed increases in the drought index, the area under extreme threat of fires, and the days of fire danger, stating that, "The increase in extreme fire risk is expected within the coming decade to exceed that of natural variability and this serves as an indication that anthropogenic climate warming will likely play a significant role in influence California’s fire season."

Fires 
Below is a list of all fires that exceeded  during the 2014 California wildfire season, as well as the fires that caused significant damage. The list is taken from CAL FIRE's list of large fires.

May San Diego County wildfires

In May 2014, a series of at least 20 wildfires broke out in San Diego County during severe Santa Ana Wind conditions, historic drought conditions, and a heat wave. The main event during mid-May was preceded by a precursor fire that ignited on May 5. The severe weather conditions contributed to the spread of at least 19 more individual wildfires, with ten of them receiving names. The Cocos Fire, which was the most destructive with 40 structured being destroyed, was determined to have been caused by arson. The causes of the other fires are still under investigation by multiple agencies, and a joint task force was formed to coordinate the investigations and facilitate communications. Six injuries and one fire-related fatality were reported.

Miguelito Fire
At 2:00 PM PDT on May 13, the Miguelito Fire broke out off Santa Miguelito Canyon Road in Lompoc, Santa Barbara County. Over the course of the next week and a half, the fire gradually expanded northward to  towards the direction of Lompoc, before firefighters managed to stop its expansion on May 16. The fire threatened 1,200 buildings in Lompoc, prompting evacuation orders for the affected areas. On May 16, evacuation orders were lifted, after the fire was reported to be 95% contained. At 9:20 AM PDT on May 19, the Miguelito Fire was reported to be 100% contained. No structural damage or injuries were reported.

Hunters Fire
On May 27, at 3:00 PM PDT, the Hunters Fire broke out at Hunters Valley Access Road Bear Valley Area, in Mariposa County. The fire spread toward populated areas and evacuations were ordered for the Hunters Valley Area.

Stony Fire
On June 19, at 3:14 PM PDT, the Stony Fire was reported at Stony Valley Range on Fort Hunter Liggett, in Monterey County. Moderate amounts of smoke still lingered within the area, and cleanup work was expected to continue for the next few days. The Nacimiento-Ferguson Road was also closed due to downed trees, but was expected to reopen a couple of days later. No evacuations were ordered for this fire, and no injuries or fatalities were reported. The cause of the wildfire is currently under investigation.

Butts Fire
On July 1, at 12:08 PM PDT, the Butts Fire broke out near Butts Canyon Road in Pope Valley, California, northwest of Lake Berryessa, in Yolo County.

Banner Fire
The Banner Fire erupted around 10:30 AM PDT on July 3, 2014 in the Banner, California area, near Route 78 in San Diego County. Portions of Route 78 were closed, and mandatory evacuation was ordered for 200 homes; however, the evacuation order was lifted later that evening, as the containment of the wildfire's perimeter increased. Two homes were destroyed, but the heavy use of firefighting planes and helicopters prevented additional losses.

Monticello Fire
The fire was reported around 9:30 p.m. on Friday, July 4, and quickly grew in size, due to dry and erratic windy conditions. By 11 PM that night, the fire was 100 acres in size, and by 4 AM the next morning, it was already 1,000 acres, according to Winters City Manager John Donlevy, who added that, "...the hills are literally tinder-dry." Highway 128 west of Winters was shut down due to the fire while thirty-four structures at Golden Bear Estates were immediately threatened, resulting in the mandatory evacuation of residents in that area. A separate voluntary evacuation order for the Canyon Creek Resort campground was also put into effect but lifted later that day. As the fire burned north into rugged, steep terrain, access to the area became difficult, limiting firefighting operations. An American Red Cross Shelter was immediately set up at Winters Community Center at 4 a.m. that Saturday morning for over 40 evacuees.

On Sunday, July 6, containment of the Monticello fire grew to 30 percent, while at least 1,275 firefighters were reported battling the blaze. Fire conditions remained volatile as wind directors switched several times throughout the day, reached gusts of up to 20 mph.

All evacuation orders were lifted on Monday, July 7, as containment of the fire grew to 45 percent, with over 1,750 fire personnel on hand. Within the following days, containment lines grew and by July 11, the incident was 95 percent contained with investigators still trying to determine the cause of the fire. The fire was finally contained on July 12, after destroying , however no structures were damaged. The cause of the fire was later determined to be firework-related.

Sand Fire
The Sand Fire was ignited in El Dorado County, five miles north of the Amador County town of Plymouth, on July 25, at 4:34 PM PDT, by a vehicle driving over dry vegetation. Twelve hundred residences were evacuated before full containment of the wildfire was achieved on August 2.

Gulch Fire
On September 10, a car fire started a fire in the Bella Vista area. On September 16, the Gulch Fire was fully contained after burning . The wildfire has also injured a total of 4 people. The damage caused by the Gulch Fire is currently unknown.

See also

 May 2014 San Diego County wildfires
 2016 California wildfires
 List of California wildfires
 Climate change in California
 2014–15 North American winter

References

 
California, 2014
Wildfires in California by year